"Un garçon pas comme les autres (Ziggy)" (meaning "A Boy Unlike the Others (Ziggy)") is a French-language song written by Luc Plamondon and Michel Berger for the 1978 cyberpunk rock opera, Starmania. In 1991, it was covered by Canadian singer Celine Dion for her album, Dion chante Plamondon. The song was released as the second commercial single in France in July 1993 and became a hit, reaching number two. Later, it was also featured on Dion's greatest hits albums, The Collector's Series, Volume One (2000) and On ne change pas (2005).

Background and release
Telling the story of a woman's impassioned love for a gay man, "Ziggy" was performed originally by Fabienne Thibeault in the Starmania musical in 1978.

Dion recorded this song also in English. It was included on the Tycoon compilation in September 1992, which achieved platinum status in France.

There were two similar music videos made for the French and English version (1993). Both of them were directed by Lewis Furey (husband and producer of Quebec actress/singer Carole Laure). The first one can be found on Dion's DVD called On ne change pas (2005). The music video features Dion sitting in the bleachers of a stadium and longing for a football player who is preoccupied with teammates. At the end, he is walking up to what appears to be a guy in a pullover with a hood over his head. When the hood is removed as they kiss, it is revealed to be Dion. The model in the video is Rodney Weber. It was uploaded to YouTube and remastered in HD in November 2021.

Dion performed this song during Francophone concerts in her tours since 1994, including her concerts at the Stade de France in 1999 and the Taking Chances World Tour of 2008. Live versions of "Ziggy" became a part of Dion's albums: À l'Olympia, Live à Paris, Au cœur du stade, and Céline une seule fois / Live 2013. Dion also performed "Ziggy" during her Summer Tour 2016, her French concerts in 2017 and her Courage World Tour.

"Ziggy" peaked at number 2 in France and was certified Gold for selling 365,000 copies. It was held from number one by Freddie Mercury's "Living on My Own" (1993 Remix). "Ziggy" spent almost a year on the chart, including 7 weeks at number 2 position and 18 weeks in the top 10. It was Dion's biggest hit in France since 1983 "D'amour ou d'amitié".

Formats and track listings
French cassette and CD single
"Ziggy" (English Version) – 2:56
"Un garçon pas comme les autres (Ziggy)" – 2:56

Charts

Weekly charts

Decade-end charts

Certifications and sales

Release history

See also
French Top 100 singles of the 1990s

References

External links

1978 songs
1993 singles
Celine Dion songs
French-language songs
LGBT-related songs
Pop ballads
Songs with lyrics by Luc Plamondon
Songs written by Michel Berger